Finland competed at the 1924 Summer Olympics in Paris, France. 121 competitors, all men, took part in 69 events in 12 sports.

Medalists

Athletics

Fifty-two athletes represented Finland in 1924. It was the nation's fourth appearance in the sport as well as the Games. Nurmi won gold medals and set Olympic records in both the 1500 and 5000 metre races, with Ritola very close on his heels in the 5000 for silver. The pair finished first and second in the same order in the cross country race, as well. Nurmi did not defend his 1920 title in the 10000 metres, but Ritola earned the victory and the world record in that race. Ritola took another individual gold medal in the 3000 metre steeplechase. Nurmi and Ritola were each members of both the 3000 meter team race and team cross country teams which won gold; this gave Nurmi a total of five gold medals while Ritola took four golds and two silvers.

Stenroos won the marathon, while Myyrä took the javelin championship and Lehtonen finished first in the pentathlon. In all, the Finnish athletes took 17 medals, 10 of which were gold. They were second place behind the United States in both the total and gold medal counts in athletics.

Wilén earned an odd distinction: he set an Olympic record in a race which he did not win. He finished third in the 400 metre hurdles final after a pair of American hurdlers. The race winner, however, had knocked over a hurdle and his time was therefore ineligible to be considered a record. The second place runner had strayed outside his lane and was therefore disqualified. The result of all this was that Wilén received a silver medal and an Olympic record.

Ranks given are within the heat.

Cycling

Four cyclists represented Finland in 1924. It was the nation's second appearance in the sport.

Road cycling

Ranks given are within the heat.

Diving

Six divers, all men, represented Finland in 1924. It was the nation's fourth appearance in the sport as well as the Games. Kärkkäinen was the only Finnish diver to advance to a final, finishing ninth in the platform event.

Ranks given are within the heat.

 Men

Equestrian

A single equestrian represented Finland in 1924. It was the nation's second appearance in the sport.

Gymnastics

Eight gymnasts represented Finland in 1924. It was the nation's third appearance in the sport.

Artistic

Modern pentathlon

Three pentathletes represented Finland in 1924. It was the nation's second appearance in the sport.

Sailing

A single sailor represented Finland in 1924. It was the nation's second appearance in the sport.

Shooting

Fifteen sport shooters represented Finland in 1924. It was the nation's fourth appearance in the sport as well as the Games. Seeking unsuccessfully to win its first gold medal in the sport, Finland matched its medal totals from 1920, taking a silver and two bronzes.

Swimming

Ranks given are within the heat.

 Men

Tennis

 Men

Wrestling

Freestyle wrestling

 Men's

Greco-Roman

 Men's

Art Competitions

References

External links

Official Olympic Reports
International Olympic Committee results database

Nations at the 1924 Summer Olympics
1924
Olympics